Dead in the Water is a 1997 novel by author Stuart Woods. It belongs in the Thriller and Mystery genre.

Set on the island of St. Marks, after the events in Dirt.  The novel centers around Stone Barrington, a retired detective turned lawyer/private investigator, and Allison Manning, a young women accused of murder. It is third novel in the Stone Barrington series.

Plot 

On a short vacation to escape his now hectic life in New York City, Stone Barrington set his sight on a lovely and romantic getaway to the islands of St. Marks. His companion, Arrington Carter, all-round superstar was to join him the next day.
 
Three events would ruin Stone's plans for a romantic boat cruise about the islands and leave him in the midst of a life or death trial. One was the New York weather, snowing in every airport available. Next was the saddening and fearsome ambition of his beau, Arrington Carter, high-profile host and interviewer, who decided to track down another must-have editorial. Last was the sweet and gorgeous All-American girl standing trial for murdering her husband, where if convicted meant death, by hanging.
 
Racing to prove the young widow innocent of any wrongdoing pits Stone against a determined protector standing on the verge of becoming the next Prime Minister of St. Marks. With little time to work the case, leaving the young woman's head in a balance, Stone, once a police officer, now an up-and-coming lawyer, will do what he does best, defend his client with every skill he has to offer.  Stone just hopes he didn't lose the new love of his life for his own fearsome and saddening ambition.

References

External links
Stuart Woods website

1997 American novels
HarperCollins books
Novels set on islands